Reedswood Park is a public park situated in Walsall, West Midlands, England.

It is surrounded by the residential areas of Birchills and Beechdale, and is about half a mile west of Walsall town centre.

The park featured an outdoor public swimming pool a number of years ago; it was popular and in constant use in the 1920s, 1930s, 1940s, and 1950s. This has now been demolished. The park has a skating ramp as well as a children's play area and a basketball court.

Walsall
Parks and open spaces in the West Midlands (county)